Armodafinil (trade name Nuvigil) is the enantiopure compound of the eugeroic modafinil (Provigil).  It consists of only the (R)-(−)-enantiomer of the racemic modafinil. Armodafinil is produced by the pharmaceutical company Cephalon Inc. and was approved by the U.S. Food and Drug Administration (FDA) in June 2007. In 2016, the FDA granted Mylan rights for the first generic version of Cephalon's Nuvigil to be marketed in the U.S.

Because armodafinil has a longer half-life than modafinil does, it may be more effective at improving wakefulness in patients with excessive daytime sleepiness.

Medical uses
Armodafinil is currently FDA-approved to treat excessive daytime sleepiness associated with obstructive sleep apnea, narcolepsy, and shift work disorder. It is commonly used off-label to treat attention deficit hyperactivity disorder, chronic fatigue syndrome, and major depressive disorder, and has been repurposed as an adjunctive treatment for bipolar disorder. It has been shown to improve vigilance in air traffic controllers, however in the United States, sleep prevention medications such as Provigil (Modafinil) and Nuvigil (Armodafinil) are not approved by the FAA for civilian controllers or pilots.

Psychiatry

Bipolar disorder
Armodafinil, along with racemic modafinil, has been repurposed as an adjunctive treatment for acute depression in people with bipolar disorder. Meta-analytic evidence showed that add-on modafinil and armodafinil were more effective than placebo on response to treatment, clinical remission, and reduction in depressive symptoms, with only minor side effects, but the effect sizes are small and the quality of evidence has to be considered low, limiting the clinical relevance of current evidence.

Schizophrenia

In June 2010, it was revealed that a phase II study of armodafinil as an adjunctive therapy in adults with schizophrenia had failed to meet the primary endpoints, and the clinical program was subsequently terminated. However, a study published later that year showed that patients with schizophrenia treated with armodafinil showed fewer of the negative symptoms of schizophrenia.

Jet lag
On March 30, 2010, the FDA declined to approve use of Nuvigil to treat jet lag.

Adverse effects
In placebo-controlled studies, the most commonly observed side effects were headache, xerostomia (dry mouth), nausea, dizziness, and insomnia. Possible side effects also include depression, anxiety, hallucinations, euphoria, extreme increase in activity and talking, anorexia, tremor, thirst, rash, suicidal thoughts, and aggression. Symptoms of an overdose on armodafinil include trouble sleeping, restlessness, confusion, disorientation, feeling excited, mania, hallucinations, nausea, diarrhea, severely increased or decreased heart beat, chest pain, and increased blood pressure. Serious rashes can develop in rare cases, and require immediate medical attention due to the possibility of Steven's-Johnson Syndrome, or other hypersensitivities to armodafinil.

Pharmacology

Pharmacodynamics
The mechanism of action of armodafinil is unknown. Armodafinil (R-(−)-modafinil) has pharmacological properties almost identical to those of modafinil (a mixture of R-(−)- and (S)-(+)-modafinil). The (R)- and (S)-enantiomers have similar pharmacological action in animals. Armodafinil has wake-promoting actions similar to sympathomimetic agents including amphetamine and methylphenidate, although its pharmacologic profile is not identical to that of the sympathomimetic amines. Armodafinil is an indirect dopamine receptor agonist; it binds in vitro to the dopamine transporter (DAT) and inhibits dopamine reuptake. For modafinil, this activity has been associated in vivo with increased extracellular dopamine levels. In genetically engineered mice lacking the dopamine transporter, modafinil lacked wake-promoting activity, suggesting that this activity was DAT-dependent. However, the wake-promoting effects of modafinil, unlike those of amphetamine, were not antagonized by the dopamine receptor antagonist haloperidol in rats.  In addition, alpha-methyl-p-tyrosine, an inhibitor of dopamine synthesis, blocks the action of amphetamine but does not block locomotor activity induced by modafinil.

In addition to its wake-promoting effects and ability to increase locomotor activity in animals, according to Nuvigil prescribing information from manufacturer Cephalon, armodafinil produces psychoactive and euphoric effects, alterations in mood, perception, thinking, and feelings typical of other central nervous system (CNS) stimulants in humans. Armodafinil, like racemic modafinil, may also possess reinforcing properties, as evidenced by its self-administration in monkeys previously trained to administer cocaine; armodafinil was also partially discriminated as stimulant-like. A Cephalon-founded study in which patients were administered modafinil, methylphenidate, and a placebo found that modafinil produces "psychoactive and euphoric effects and feelings consistent with [methylphenidate]."

Pharmacokinetics
Armodafinil exhibits linear time-independent kinetics following single and multiple oral dose administration. Increase in systemic exposure is proportional over the dose range of 50–400 mg. No time-dependent change in kinetics was observed through 12 weeks of dosing. Apparent steady state for armodafinil was reached within 7 days of dosing. At steady state, the systemic exposure for armodafinil is 1.8 times the exposure observed after a single dose. The concentration-time profiles of the (R)-(−)-enantiomer following a single dose of 50 mg Nuvigil or 100 mg Provigil (modafinil being a 1:1 mixture of (R)-(−)- and (S)-(−)- enantiomers) are nearly superimposable. However, the Cmax of armodafinil at steady state was 37% higher following administration of 200 mg Nuvigil than the corresponding value of modafinil following administration of 200 mg Provigil due to the more rapid clearance of the (S)-(+)-enantiomer.

Absorption
Armodafinil is readily absorbed after oral administration. The absolute oral bioavailability was not determined due to the aqueous insolubility of armodafinil, which precluded intravenous administration. Peak plasma concentrations are attained at approximately 2 hours in the fasted state. Food effect on the overall bioavailability of armodafinil is considered minimal; however, time to reach peak concentration may be delayed 2–4 hours in the fed state. Since the delay in Tmax is also associated with elevated plasma concentration later in time, food can potentially affect the onset and time course of pharmacologic action of armodafinil.

Legal status

In Australia, and the United States, Armodafinil is considered to be a Schedule 4 prescription-only medicine or prescription animal remedy. Schedule 4 is defined as "Substances, the use or supply of which should be by or on the order of persons permitted by State or Territory legislation to prescribe and should be available from a pharmacist on prescription."

Romania 
As of 2021, new laws do not directly include Armodafinil as a doping agent, but they do include Modafinil, as Armodafinil is an enantiomer of Modafinil it will show up on lab tests, but it can be debated if it is or not the same substance.

New laws state that simple possession is not a criminal offence and is punished with a fine and confiscation. Importing into Romania and exporting from Romania of the substance, without a valid medical prescription, is a criminal offence and is punished with jail time between two and seven years.

Marketing

Brand names
Armodafinil is sold under a wide variety of brand names worldwide:

See also

References

External links 
 Nuvigil (armodafinil) Tablets Official Site
 Medication Guide for Patients
 Full Prescribing Information

Acetamides
CYP3A4 inducers
Dopamine reuptake inhibitors
Drugs with unknown mechanisms of action
Enantiopure drugs
Stimulants
Sulfoxides
World Anti-Doping Agency prohibited substances